Tell Me Tonight or Be Mine Tonight is a 1932 British musical comedy film directed by Anatole Litvak and starring Jan Kiepura, Sonnie Hale and Magda Schneider. It was shot in Berlin at the Babelsberg Studios as part of a co-production between Gainsborough Pictures and the German firm Cine-Allianz. A separate German-language version The Song of Night was also released.

Cast
 Jan Kiepura as Enrico Ferraro  
 Sonnie Hale as Alexander Koretsky  
 Magda Schneider as Mathilde Pategg  
 Edmund Gwenn as Mayor Pategg  
 Athene Seyler as Mrs. Pategg  
 Betty Chester as Miss Barker  
 Aubrey Mather as Balthasar

References

Bibliography 
 Creekmur, Corey & Mokdad, Linda. The International Film Musical. Edinburgh University Press, 2012.
 Wood, Linda. British Films, 1927-1939. British Film Institute, 1986.

External links 
 

1932 films
1932 musical comedy films
British musical comedy films
1930s English-language films
British multilingual films
Gainsborough Pictures films
Films directed by Anatole Litvak
Cine-Allianz films
British black-and-white films
Films shot at Babelsberg Studios
1932 multilingual films
1930s British films